Katja Woywood (born 10 May 1971 in West Berlin, West Germany) is a German actress and former child star in her native land. She started playing in movies and series as a 15 year old girl. Her hobbies are drawing and roller skating. Since episode 189 she plays the new chief of the highway police in the German action-series Alarm für Cobra 11 – Die Autobahnpolizei.

Personal life
She married actor Marco Girnth in August 1998. They have one child named Niklas.

Filmography
 1985: Ich knüpfte manche zarte Bande
 1987: Der Schatz im Niemandsland
 1988: Fest im Sattel
 1989: The Black Forest Clinic
 1989: Hessische Geschichten
 1989: Hotel Paradies
 1990: Pension Corona
 1991–1998: Tatort
 1991: Weißblaue Geschichten
 1991: Altes Herz wird nochmal jung
 1992–2000: Das Traumschiff
 1992: Ein Heim für Tiere
 1992: Der Fotograf oder Das Auge Gottes 
 1992: Glückliche Reise
 1993: Happy Holiday
 1993: Schuld war nur der Bossa Nova
 1993: Großstadtrevier
 1993: 
 1994: Der Nelkenkönig
 1994: Die Stadtindianer
 1994: Die Weltings vom Hauptbahnhof – Scheidung auf Kölsch
 1994: Um jeden Preis
 1995–1999: Der Landarzt
 1995: Ein unvergeßliches Wochenende
 1995: Mordslust
 1995: Inseln unter dem Wind
 1996: Gegen den Wind
 1996: Die Drei
 1996: Der König
 1996: SK-Babies
 1996: Wolkenstein
 1996: Die Geliebte
 1996: Die Männer vom K3
 1997–2005: The Old Fox
 1997: Derrick
 1998: SOKO München
 1998: Gehetzt – Der Tod im Sucher
 1998: Feuerläufer – Der Fluch des Vulkan
 1998: Die Wache
 1998: HeliCops – Einsatz über Berlin
 1999–2008: Siska
 1999: Verführt – Eine gefährliche Affäre
 1999: Schwarz greift ein
 1999: Rivalinnen der Liebe
 2000: Geisterjäger John Sinclair
 2000: 
 2000: Contaminated Man
 2001: Drehkreuz Airport
 2001: Rosamunde Pilcher: Blumen im Regen
 2002–2006: Leipzig Homicide
 2002–2007: Küstenwache
 2002: Sehnsucht nach Sandin
 2003: Traumprinz in Farbe
 2003: Das Glück ihres Lebens
 2003: 
 2003: Utta Danella
 2004: Inga Lindström – Die Farm am Mälarsee
 2005: Die Schwarzwaldklinik – Die nächste Generation
 2005: Pfarrer Braun
 2006–2008: SOKO Kitzbühel
 2006–2009: Die Rosenheim-Cops
 2006: Das Traumhotel
 2007: Ein Fall für zwei
 2007: War ich gut?
 2007: Beim nächsten Tanz wird alles anders
 2007: Das Wunder der Liebe
 2008–2010: Kreuzfahrt ins Glück
 2008: Zoogeflüster – Komm mir nicht ins Gehege!
 2009–2019: Alarm für Cobra 11 – Die Autobahnpolizei
 2009: Kommissar LaBréa - Tod an der Bastille
 2009: In aller Freundschaft
 2010: Der Bergdoktor
 2011: Toni Costa: Kommissar auf Ibiza - Der rote Regen
 2012: Toni Costa - Kommissar auf Ibiza - Küchenkunst
 2013: IK 1 - Touristen in Gefahr
 2013: Kripo Holstein - Mord und Meer
 2015: Josephine Klick - Allein unter Cops
 2016: Die Truckerin
 2017: Gezeichnet

References

External links

 

1971 births
Living people
Actresses from Berlin
German film actresses
German television actresses